Scott Thomas Blewett (born April 10, 1996) is an American professional baseball pitcher who is a free agent. He previously played in Major League Baseball (MLB) for the Kansas City Royals.

Amateur career
Blewett attended Charles W. Baker High School in Baldwinsville, New York. He committed to play college baseball at St. John's University. As a senior, he was the Gatorade Baseball Player of the Year for New York. Blewett was drafted by the Kansas City Royals in the second round of the 2014 Major League Baseball draft. He signed for $1.8 million.

Professional career

Kansas City Royals
After signing, Blewett made his professional debut with the Burlington Royals, going 1–2 with a 4.82 ERA in eight games (seven starts). He played 2015 and 2016 with the Lexington Legends, posting a 3–5 record with a 5.20 ERA over 18 starts in 2015 and an 8–11 record with a 4.31 ERA in 25 starts in 2016, and 2017 with the Wilmington Blue Rocks, where he went 7–10 with a 4.07 ERA in a career high innings pitched, making 27 starts. He spent the 2018 season with the Northwest Arkansas Naturals, going 8–6 with a 4.79 ERA in 26 games (25 starts).

The Royals added Blewett to their 40-man roster after the 2018 season. He began 2019 with the Omaha Storm Chasers, and also spent time with the Naturals. Over 23 games (21 starts) between the two teams, Blewett went 6–11 with a 7.34 ERA, striking out ninety over  innings.

On August 5, 2020, Blewett was promoted to the major leagues for the first time. He was optioned down the next day without making a major league appearance. He was recalled on August 15, but again sent down without play a day later. On September 16, he was recalled again, and made his major league debut on September 18 against the Milwaukee Brewers, pitching 2 scoreless innings.

On April 1, 2021, Blewett was designated for assignment by the Royals. On April 6, Blewett was outrighted to the alternate training site.
Blewett was selected back to the Royals roster during September, and pitched 5 innings, giving up 1 run. On October 29, Blewett elected free agency.

Chicago White Sox
On April 9, 2022, Blewett signed a minor league contract with the Chicago White Sox organization. He elected free agency on November 10, 2022.

References

External links

1996 births
Living people
Baseball players from Syracuse, New York
Burlington Royals players
Kansas City Royals players
Lexington Legends players
Major League Baseball pitchers
Northwest Arkansas Naturals players
Omaha Storm Chasers players
Surprise Saguaros players
Wilmington Blue Rocks players